Elections to Fermanagh District Council were held on 7 June 2001 on the same day as the other Northern Irish local government elections. The election used four district electoral areas to elect a total of 23 councillors.

Election results

Note: "Votes" are the first preference votes.

Districts summary

|- class="unsortable" align="centre"
!rowspan=2 align="left"|Ward
! % 
!Cllrs
! % 
!Cllrs
! %
!Cllrs
! %
!Cllrs
! %
!Cllrs
!rowspan=2|TotalCllrs
|- class="unsortable" align="center"
!colspan=2 bgcolor="" | Sinn Féin
!colspan=2 bgcolor="" | UUP
!colspan=2 bgcolor="" | SDLP
!colspan=2 bgcolor="" | DUP
!colspan=2 bgcolor="white"| Others
|-
|align="left"|Enniskillen
|25.2
|2
|bgcolor="40BFF5"|33.4
|bgcolor="40BFF5"|2
|17.8
|1
|12.6
|1
|11.0
|1
|7
|-
|align="left"|Erne East
|bgcolor="#008800"|42.3
|bgcolor="#008800"|3
|27.0
|2
|14.9
|1
|9.3
|0
|6.5
|0
|6
|-
|align="left"|Erne North
|17.7
|1
|bgcolor="40BFF5"|38.5
|bgcolor="40BFF5"|2
|21.6
|1
|22.2
|1
|0.0
|0
|5
|-
|align="left"|Erne West
|bgcolor="#008800"|48.2
|bgcolor="#008800"|3
|24.8
|1
|21.6
|1
|5.4
|0
|0.0
|0
|5
|- class="unsortable" class="sortbottom" style="background:#C9C9C9"
|align="left"| Total
|33.5
|9
|30.8
|7
|18.7
|4
|12.1
|2
|4.9
|1
|23
|-
|}

District results

Enniskillen

1997: 3 x UUP, 1 x Sinn Féin, 1 x SDLP, 1 x DUP, 1 x Independent Socialist
2001: 2 x UUP, 2 x Sinn Féin, 1 x SDLP, 1 x DUP, 1 x Independent
1997-2001 Change: Sinn Féin gain from UUP, Independent Socialist becomes Independent

Erne East

1997: 2 x Sinn Féin, 2 x UUP, 1 x SDLP, 1 x Independent Nationalist
2001: 3 x Sinn Féin, 2 x UUP, 1 x SDLP
1997-2001 Change: Sinn Féin gain from Independent Nationalist

Erne North

1997: 2 x UUP, 1 x DUP, 1 x SDLP, 1 x Sinn Féin
2001: 2 x UUP, 1 x DUP, 1 x SDLP, 1 x Sinn Féin
1997-2001 Change: No change

Erne West

1997: 2 x UUP, 1 x Sinn Féin, 1 x SDLP, 1 x Independent Nationalist
2001: 3 x Sinn Féin, 1 x UUP, 1 x SDLP
1997-2001 Change: Sinn Féin (two seats) gain from UUP and Independent Nationalist

References

2001 Northern Ireland local elections
21st century in County Fermanagh
Fermanagh District Council elections